Patrik Šurnovský (born 13 November 1997) is a Slovak footballer who plays for Komárno as a left-back.

Club career
Šurnovský made his professional Fortuna Liga debut for Nitra against Ružomberok on 9 March 2019. While Šurnovský had started in the starting XI, but was replaced by Pavol Farkaš a minute before stoppage time. The match concluded in a goal-less tie.

References

External links
 FC Nitra official club profile 
 Futbalnet profile 
 
 

1997 births
Living people
Slovak footballers
Association football defenders
FC Nitra players
KFC Komárno players
Slovak Super Liga players
2. Liga (Slovakia) players
People from Nové Zámky
Sportspeople from the Nitra Region